The Captain of the Honourable Corps of Gentlemen-at-Arms is a post in the Government of the United Kingdom that has been held by the Government Chief Whip in the House of Lords since 1945. Prior to 17 March 1834, the Gentlemen-at-Arms were known as the Honourable Band of Gentlemen Pensioners.

List of Captains of the Gentlemen-at-Arms

Ceremonial officers in the United Kingdom
Honourable Corps of Gentlemen at Arms
Lists of government ministers of the United Kingdom
Positions within the British Royal Household